Jane Alice (Jenny) Morris (17 January 1861 – 11 July 1935) was an embroiderer. She was the elder daughter of William Morris and Jane Morris and sister to May Morris.

Life 
Jenny Morris was born 17 January 1861 at Red House, Bexleyheath. The elder child of the designer, craftsman, and writer William Morris and Jane Morris (née Burden), her younger sister May Morris was born a year later.

Jenny and her sister May were schooled at home, briefly attending Notting Hill High School. Highly intelligent, Jenny passed her Cambridge local examinations and was destined for one of the woman's colleges at Oxford or Cambridge University. However in 1867, she developed epilepsy. At first her symptoms were a relatively low level of severity, however as she got older her attacks got more frequent and severe. Whilst her parents were alive, Jenny lived at home in London, or for extended periods staying by the coast with a companion. After her mother died, her sister May took over responsibility for arranging her care.

Along with her sister and mother, Jenny was skilled in embroidery, and examples of her work are in the collection of the William Morris Gallery, London. Although these pieces show fine workmanship, her embroidery was limited to personal items for the family. A collection of letters written by Jenny to her father's legal executor Sydney Cockerell between 1897 and 1919 are in the British Library.

She died at Over Stowey (in Somerset) on 11 July 1935 at the age of 74 of diabetic complications.

Notes

External links
 Photographs of Jenny at The National Portrait Gallery, London
 Portraits of Jenny Morris at the William Morris Gallery 
 Works by Jenny Morris at the William Morris Gallery 
  National Trust
 

1861 births
1935 deaths
British embroiderers
British textile artists
People educated at Notting Hill & Ealing High School